John Westerdale Bowker (born 30 July 1935) is an English Anglican priest and pioneering scholar of religious studies. A former Director of Studies and Dean of Chapel at Corpus Christi and Trinity College, Cambridge he is credited with introducing religious studies as a discipline to Cambridge University. He has been a Professor of religious studies at the universities of Cambridge, Lancaster, Pennsylvania and North Carolina State University. He is an Honorary Canon of Canterbury Cathedral, a consultant for UNESCO, a BBC broadcaster and author and editor of numerous books.

Life
Bowker was educated at St John's School, Leatherhead, Worcester College, Oxford and Ripon Hall, Oxford. He undertook his national service with the RWAFF in northern Nigeria and then became the Henry Stevenson Fellow at the University of Sheffield in 1961.  He then moved to the University of Cambridge where he was Dean of Chapel of Corpus Christi College, Cambridge (1962) and Assistant Lecturer (1965) and Lecturer (1970). In 1974 he was appointed Professor of Religious Studies at the University of Lancaster, and in 1984 moved back to Cambridge as Dean of Chapel of Trinity College, Cambridge (1984–91) and a Fellow of Trinity College, Cambridge (1984–93), also teaching, supervising and researching at the University. From 1992 to 1997 he was Gresham professor of Divinity at Gresham College, London.

He was appointed adjunct professor at the University of Pennsylvania and at North Carolina State University in 1986.

He gave many invited lectures including the Wilde (University of Oxford), Riddell Newcastle University, Boutwood University of Cambridge, Scott Holland University of London, Bicentenary Georgetown University.

He served on various commissions including the Archbishops' Commission on Doctrine (1977–86).  He was appointed Vice-President of the Institute on Religion in an Age of Science in 1980.

Academic work
Bowker has written and edited many books on world religions.  He has also taken a deep interest in science and religion and in particular the relationship of biology and psychology to religion.

In 1983 he edited Violence and Aggression and 1987 he wrote Licensed Insanities: religions and belief in God in the contemporary world

In 1992 and 1993 he gave lectures at Gresham College analysing in detail the claim by Richard Dawkins that belief in God was a kind of mental virus.  In the scientific parts he collaborated with Quinton Deeley, a student of his whose dissertation on biogenetic structuralism led to his deciding to re-train as a doctor and is now a published psychiatrist. He suggests that this "account of religious motivation...is...far removed from evidence and data." and that, even if the God-meme approach were valid, "it does not give rise to one set of consequences... Out of the many behaviours it produces, why are we required to isolate only those that might be regarded as diseased? And who ... decides, and on what grounds, what is diseased? ... there is nothing here as objective as the observation of chicken-pox... the observer...is highly relative".

In his 2005 book The Sacred Neuron: The Extraordinary New Discoveries Linking Science and Religion he suggests that it is incorrect to view faith and reason as opposing functions. He argues that recent discoveries in the neurosciences are revealing startling facts about the workings of the human mind and how certain ideas are processed into beliefs. His publishers assert that "John Bowker shows that faith and belief are not separate or distinct from reason, but are actually rooted in it. And science—especially neurophysiology—is the key to unlocking how we think about God, about the relationship between different cultures and religions, and about the processes of the human mind that influence our behavior. When rationality and faith are viewed as complementary a new understanding of the human mind can serve as a basis for resolving conflicts between religions and cultures. This discovery has stunning implications for the world."

Bibliography

 Religion Hurts: Why Religions do Harm as well as Good (2018) Society for Promoting Christian Knowledge, 

 Why Religions Matter (2015) Cambridge University Press   Paperback.  Hardback
 God: A very Short Introduction (2014) Oxford University Press, 
 The Message and the Book (2011) Atlantic Books  Hardback
 Beliefs That Changed the World (2007) 
 World Religions (2006) Dorling Kindersley, 
 The Sacred Neuron: The Extraordinary New Discoveries Linking Science and Religion Palgrave macMillan (2005) 
 God: A Brief History (2004) Dorling Kindersley, 
 The Cambridge Illustrated History of Religion (2002—editor)
 The Complete Bible Handbook (1998) 2nd Ed (2004)
 The Oxford Dictionary of World Religions (1997), Oxford University Press, 
 Licensed Insanities: religions and belief in God in the contemporary world (1997) DLT 
 The Sense of God Oneworld Publications (1995) 
 What Muslims Believe (1995)
 Is God a Virus?: Genes, Culture and Religion (1995) SPCK 
 The Meanings of Death (1991)
 Worlds of Faith: Religious belief and practice in Britain today (1989) BBC 
 Jesus and the Pharisees (1973)
 The Problems of Suffering in the Religions of the World (1970)
 Targums and Rabbinic Literature (1969)

Sources
 Who's Who 2004
 Amazon.com
 Palgrave MacMillan website
 Books cited

References

English Anglican theologians
Living people
Alumni of Worcester College, Oxford
University of Pennsylvania faculty
Academics of the University of Sheffield
Academics of Lancaster University
1935 births
20th-century English Anglican priests
21st-century English Anglican priests
Professors of Gresham College
Canons of Canterbury
Alumni of Ripon College Cuddesdon
Fellows of Trinity College, Cambridge
North Carolina State University faculty
People educated at St John's School, Leatherhead
20th-century Anglican theologians
21st-century Anglican theologians